Lajamina is a corregimiento in Pocrí District, Los Santos Province, Panama with a population of 514 as of 2010. Its population as of 1990 was 685; its population as of 2000 was 627.

References

Corregimientos of Los Santos Province